Leona stoehri, the confused recluse, is a butterfly in the family Hesperiidae. It is found in Ivory Coast, Ghana, Togo, Cameroon, the Central African Republic and the Democratic Republic of the Congo. The habitat consists of forests.

References

Butterflies described in 1893
Erionotini
Butterflies of Africa